Allomethus rotundicornis is a species of fly in the family Pipunculidae. It was described by Hardy in 1954.

Distribution
Brazil.

References 

Pipunculidae
Insects described in 1954
Diptera of South America
Taxa named by D. Elmo Hardy